Almost Everything is an album by American jazz pianist Don Friedman recorded in Denmark in 1995 and released on the Danish SteepleChase label.

Critical reception

Ken Dryden, writing for AllMusic, described the album as "one of his finest studio sessions... Highly recommended" and stated "Don Friedman may be one of the best-kept secrets in jazz, in spite of a lengthy career and numerous recordings as a leader".

Track listing 
All compositions by Don Friedman, except where indicated.
 "On Green Dolphin Street" (Bronisław Kaper) – 6:28
 "Flamands" – 6:38
 "Waltz for Marilyn" – 11:03
 "Before the Rain" – 5:38
 "Emily" (Johnny Mandel) – 6:58
 "Twigs and Branches" (Matt Wilson) – 5:39
 "El Niño" (Ron McClure) – 8:13
 "Darn That Dream" (Jimmy Van Heusen) – 8:24
 "Almost Everything" – 6:55

Personnel 
Don Friedman – piano
Ron McClure – bass
Matt Wilson – drums

References 

1995 albums
Don Friedman albums
SteepleChase Records albums